Sigraid Ó Maolconaire was the Ollamh Síol Muireadaigh, died 1487.

The Annals of Connacht, sub anno 1487, state:

 O Mailchonaire, that is Sigraid son of Sean Ruad, died.

The later compilation known as the Annals of the Four Masters provide more detail:

 Seery O'Mulconry, Ollav of Sil-Murray, head of the cheerfulness and jocularity of the men of Ireland, died; and two Kenfinès of the tribe were set up in his place, namely, Donnell and Mulconry, the son of Torna.

Sources

The Encyclopaedia of Ireland 2003; .
 Mac Dermot of Moylurg: The Story of a Connacht Family Dermot Mac Dermot, 1996.
A New History of Ireland VIII: A Chronology of Irish History to 1976 - A Companion to Irish History Part I edited by T.W. Moody, F.X. Martin and F. J. Byrne, 1982. 
The Celebrated Antiquary Nollaig O Muralie, Maynooth, 1996. 
Irish Leaders and Learning Through the Ages Fr. Paul Walsh, 2004. (ed. Nollaig O Muralie).

External links
List of Published Texts at CELT — University College Cork's Corpus of Electronic Texts

15th-century deaths
15th-century Irish historians
People from County Roscommon
15th-century Irish poets
Year of birth unknown
Irish male poets